The Sharon Academy (TSA) refers both to a middle and high school located in Sharon, Vermont, USA.

History
The Academy opened as a middle school with 12 students in one classroom of an old schoolhouse in September 1996. When students in the first class approached 8th grade graduation, and the prospect of transferring to high school, they expressed a desire to continue their education at TSA. The Vermont Department of Education approved the Academy's application to expand to include grades 9–12.

Enrollment numbers grew annually until the school reached its full capacity of 156 students. The Academy had outgrown the old schoolhouse, and construction began on a new facility on a hill overlooking the White River. The middle school continues to offer integrated studies at The Old Schoolhouse in Sharon, while the high school occupies the new facility, with a full size gym, a yurt village, an art room, a writing center, library, and science lab. The common area overlooks the river, surrounding valley, and mountains.

The Academy is a member of the Coalition of Essential Schools.

Athletics

Since 2006, TSA varsity soccer has gone to the state championship match five times. Twice (in the 2008 and 2009 seasons), their undefeated boys team lost in the championship game to Black River Academy; once 1–0, and once suffering a loss in a penalty shootout, respectively. In 2010 the Phoenix had a regular season record of 12–2 however they were knocked out in a 4–3 game at the Vermont State semi-finals. In 2014, led by seniors Sawyer Levy, Silas Mead, Max Buskey, and Tanner James, TSA went 14-0 in the regular season, claiming the number two seed in D-IV, but lost 2-0 to Twin Valley in the championship game.

In 2014-15 the boys basketball team had the best record in school history at 17-3 in the regular season. Behind seniors and members of the state all-star team Brandon Tracy, Tanner James, and Andy Bando-Hess, the Phoenix went to the finals. They lost to Proctor in overtime, 70-66.

The Sharon Academy athletics has also seen students go on to be Division I, II, and III NCAA athletes in women's basketball, women's soccer, men's basketball, men's soccer, and men's track and field.

The Sharon Academy has won CVL (Central Vermont League) championships in boys and girls basketball, and boys and girls soccer.

References

Buildings and structures in Sharon, Vermont
Private high schools in Vermont
Educational institutions established in 1994
Schools in Windsor County, Vermont
Private middle schools in Vermont
1994 establishments in Vermont